Marble Bar is a town and rock formation in the Pilbara region of north-western Western Australia. Its extremely hot climate, with a mean maximum temperature second only to Wyndham, Western Australia has resulted in the town being well known for its hot weather.

History
Fossilised stromatolites, found near Marble Bar, are one of the earliest forms of life on Earth, dating to 3.5 billion years ago during the Paleoarchean era, when at that time oxygen produced aerobic organisms.

The town was officially gazetted in 1893 following the discovery of gold in the area in 1890 by a prospector named Francis Jenkins who is remembered by the name of the town's main street. The name Marble Bar was derived from a nearby jasper bar mistaken for marble and now known as Marble Bar, which runs across the bed of the Coongan River.

In 1891 the town boasted a population in excess of 5,000 as it experienced a rush on the goldfields. Several large gold nuggets were discovered as a result of the goldrush. The 333 ounce Little Hero nugget, the 413 ounce Bobby Dazzler and the 332 ounce General Gordon nugget were all found in the goldfields around the town.

By 1895 the town had its Government offices built; these are now National Trust buildings. Cut from local stone, the buildings still stand today. The town's Ironclad Hotel was built in the 1890s, and has been listed on the Western Australian register of heritage places since 2006. It is constructed of corrugated iron, and was given its name by American miners who were reminded of the Ironclad ships from the United States.

Allied airmen from the base attacked Japanese forces as far away as Borneo.

The Port Hedland to Marble Bar Railway opened on 15 July 1911, costing around £300,000 to build. Due to low traffic and high financial losses, the railway closed from 31 May 1951. This railway could be seen as a narrow gauge precursor to the network of standard gauge iron-ore railways that have since been created across the Pilbara.

Climate 
Marble Bar has a hot desert climate (Köppen BWh) with sweltering summers and warm winters. Most of the annual rainfall occurs in the summer.

Marble Bar receives 159.6 clear days annually. In contrast to most of the year, winters are warm, with days averaging , low humidity and clear skies. Nights from June to August can be chilly, occasionally as low as  but frost is unknown.

Rainfall is sparse and erratic, though variability is significantly less extreme than over the coastal Pilbara – the tenth percentile being  vis-à-vis only  in Onslow. It falls largely between December and March, with occasional rain events from autumn northwest cloudbands up to June. As little as  can fall in a year; however, during heavy wet seasons when the monsoon reaches well south into the Pilbara, the rainfall can be significantly more – as much as  fell between April 1999 and March 2000, and  fell in 1980 owing to several tropical cyclones.

North Pole
A locality nearby is known as North Pole (21° 05' S. 119° 22' E.). The location's rock formations contain stromatolites in particular rock sequences,  which some scientists have considered evidence that puts the origin of life on earth back to 3,400–3,500 million years ago.

This has been a subject of long scientific debate. The biologic explanation has been disputed with the argument that stromatolites older than 3,200 mya are not the result of living organisms (the definition of stromatolites includes both living and abiotic causes), the small conical structures in the Strelley Pool formation (Warrawoona Group) being formed by evaporation and a dome structure from the North Pole chert (also Warrawoona Group) being formed by soft-sediment deformation.

Research by Abigail Allwood on the geology of North Pole appears to confirm the biologic origins of patterns in the formation. Continuing support for their geologic origin, following the 2006 publication of her team's results in Nature led to further investigations and Allwood's development of the PIXL technology at the NASA Jet Propulsion Laboratory, for use in confirming her earlier conclusions. Use of PIXL, together with the insight gained into the organic processes that can build geologic formations, are key components of the Mars 2020 Mission.

See also
 List of weather records
 Pilbara historical timeline
 Pilbara newspapers
 Royal Commission into British nuclear tests in Australia
 Warrawoona Group – in relation to North Pole findings

References

Further reading
 Edwards, Hugh Gold dust and iron mountains : Marble Bar & beyond : the story of the Eastern Pilbara Swanbourne, W.A. : H. Edwards, 1993.  "Produced by the East Pilbara Shire for the centenary of Marble Bar, 1893–1993".

 
Mining towns in Western Australia
Towns in Western Australia
Shire of East Pilbara
Weather extremes of Earth